Husband Hunters is a 1927 American comedy-drama silent film released by Tiffany Productions, directed by John G. Adolfi, and starring Mae Busch, Charles Delaney and Jean Arthur.

Plot
The film looks at the exploits of chorus girls Marie (Mae Busch) and Helen (Duane Thompson) who have dedicated themselves to finding and marrying millionaire husbands. The two ladies enlist the help of the innocent young Lettie Crane (Jean Arthur) in their scheme. Lettie is a girl from a small town who dreams of one day making it big on Broadway.

After being enlisted by the two, Lettie is left heartbroken by a callous young man and regrets her involvement. However, by the film's end, she is the only one of the trio who finally finds true love. Another chorus girl, Cynthia Kane (Mildred Harris) follows the antics of the trio with both amusement and disapproval.

Cast
Mae Busch as Marie Devere 
Charles Delaney as Bob Garrett 
Jean Arthur as Lettie Crane 
Walter Hiers as Sylvester Jones 
Duane Thompson as Helen Gray 
Mildred Harris as Cynthia Kane 
Robert Cain as Bartley Mortimer 
James Harrison as Jimmy Wallace 
Nigel Barrie as Rex Holden

Preservation status
Previously thought to be lost film. The film is preserved at the BFI Film and Television, London.

References

External links

The AFI Catalog of Feature Films:Husband Hunters

1927 films
American silent feature films
American black-and-white films
Tiffany Pictures films
1927 comedy-drama films
1920s English-language films
1920s rediscovered films
Rediscovered American films
1920s American films
Silent American comedy-drama films